

Thomas J. Bowers (1828 – August 26, 1893) was a chief justice of the Idaho Territorial Court from July 18, 1868 to April 9, 1869. The court preceded the Idaho Supreme Court, established when Idaho became a state in 1890.

Bowers was born in 1828 in Nashville, Tennessee, where he studied law and began his practice. He moved to Nevada County, California, in 1850, then to Sierra County in 1858. Bowers married Jane L. Clark in 1857.

He was appointed Chief Justice of Idaho Territory by President Andrew Johnson in 1868. He located in Idaho City, the seat of the second judicial district. A Democrat, Bowers was replaced as chief justice in 1869 by David Noggle when Ulysses S. Grant, a Republican, became president.

After his time on the territorial court, Bowers incorporated the Ida Elmore Mining Company in 1869 and served briefly as corporate secretary and trustee, but he soon left Idaho.

Bowers returned to Marin County, California. He served as district attorney 1873-1879 and as superior court judge 1879–1884. In 1884 he resumed his law practice, locating in San Francisco until his death in 1893. He was elected judge of the San Francisco Police Court in 1892.

See also
 List of justices of the Idaho Supreme Court

References

1828 births
1893 deaths
19th-century American judges
19th-century American lawyers
Justices of the Idaho Supreme Court
Burials at Masonic Cemetery (San Francisco)
People from Nashville, Tennessee
Tennessee lawyers